Sam Russell may refer to:

Sam M. Russell (1889–1971), U.S. Representative from Texas
Sam W. Russell (1945–2014), American lawyer and politician
Sam Russell (footballer, born 1900), Irish football player
Sam Russell (footballer, born 1982), English football player for Grimsby Town
Sam Lesser (1915–2010), journalist who used the byline Sam Russell

See also
Samuel Russell (disambiguation)